Estadio Luis Alfonso Giagni is a multi-use stadium in Villa Elisa, Paraguay. It is currently used mostly for football matches and is the home stadium of Club Sol de América, who have played there since it was opened in 1984. The stadium holds 11,000 people.

References

Multi-purpose stadiums in Paraguay
Football venues in Paraguay
Sports venues in Asunción